Esham is an American rapper and producer currently signed to Reel Life Productions, a label he co-founded in 1989. His discography consists of twenty five solo-studio albums, eight studio albums as a member of NATAS, three as a member of Soopa Villainz where he is known as "Black Spade", ten EPs, as well as twenty three singles, five mixtapes, nine compilation albums, over 50 music videos, and many appearances on other artists' tracks and on compilations.

Esham initially recorded and released the self-financed album Boomin' Words from Hell in 1989. After co-founding Reel Life Productions, Esham released two more albums independently: Judgement Day and KKKill the Fetus. His next album, Closed Casket, was distributed by Warlock Records.

In 1997, he began a production agreement with Overcore Records, which co-produced his discography with the re-branded Gothom Records until Overcore went defunct. Esham's Gothom/Overcore releases were distributed internationally by TVT Records. In 2002, Esham signed with Psychopathic Records, where he achieved his highest level of success and released his album with the most consecutive charts, A-1 Yola.

Studio albums

Compilation albums

EPs

Mixtapes

Singles

Guest appearances

Production credits

Video albums

Music videos

References

Hip hop discographies
Discographies of American artists